The 2012–13 Ligue Nationale du football Amateur was the third season of the league under its current title and was the second season under its current league division format. A total of 42 teams contested the league. The league began on September 14, 2012.

League table

Groupe Est

Groupe Centre

Groupe Ouest

References

Ligue Nationale du Football Amateur seasons
3
Algeria